Nearly Human is a 1989 album by the rock musician Todd Rundgren, released by Warner Bros. Records. It was his first release in four years, although he had been active as a producer in the intervening years. Many of the album's songs deal with loss, self-doubt, jealousy and spiritual recovery. It was also the first collaboration between Rundgren and Michele Gray, a singer and ex-model who helped to organize the sessions. Gray sang backing vocals, both on the record and on subsequent tours, and the pair later married.

Recording
The song "Parallel Lines" was originally written for Rundgren's musical theater Off Broadway production of Joe Orton's Up Against It. The original version is rather slow and can be found on Rundgren's Japan-only album, Up Against It!. The song was re-recorded here with an uptempo and lusher arrangement.

Unlike a large portion of Rundgren's solo albums on which he played all the instruments and sang all lead and backing vocals, Nearly Human was performed live in the studio with numerous musicians, including the members of Rundgren's defunct band Utopia which had broken up three years earlier; Roger Powell, Kasim Sulton and John "Willie" Wilcox all play on the track "Can't Stop Running". Scott Mathews and the former The Tubes members Vince Welnick (keyboards) and Prairie Prince (drums) also perform on Nearly Human. The track "Feel It" was originally recorded (with slightly different lyrics) by the San Francisco band on its 1985 album Love Bomb, produced by Rundgren. Brent Bourgeois and Larry Tagg of Bourgeois Tagg, whom Rundgren had produced, also played on the album along with the rest of the band, making Nearly Human effectively a Rundgren-Utopia-Bourgeois Tagg-Tubes collaboration, plus extra vocalists and keyboard players.

Reception

Nearly Human received very favorable reviews. The album's single, "The Want of a Nail", featuring the soul legend Bobby Womack, was Rundgren's last charting Billboard single. One other single was released "Parallel Lines" B/W "I love My Life" but did not chart. Andrew Martin, reviewer of British music newspaper Music Week, praised the album by saying "Todd Rundgren forays into making his own albums are rarer these days, but when they do arrive they tend to be slick, taut affairs which exude class. This is no exception." In the end Martin said: "From the delicious horn-tinged overdrive of 'The Want of a Nail' to the strident bass-lead 'Unloved Children' it demonstrates a man cable of delving into a myriad of rock styles without floundering." In review of 10 June 1989 David Spodek of RPM, named this album "a welcome return." He wrote: "This is radio-tailored pop at its best, with material that will fit both AOR and NC formats" and summarized that "this LP should be a winner on radio and in the stores, provided it is backed with the right promotion in order to attract a new legion of fans to Rundgren's sound."

Japanese release
For the Japanese release of the album, the sixth finger of the handprint on the cover was removed, "due to the religious significance of six fingers in Japan".

Track listing

CD issue

LP issue 
The LP release had a slightly different track list and did not include "Two Little Hitlers".

Personnel 
 Todd Rundgren - lead vocals, guitar, arranger, producer, cover art design
 Lyle Workman - guitar
 Vernon Black - guitar
 Larry Tagg - bass guitar
 Randy Jackson - bass guitar
 Kasim Sulton - bass guitar
 Brent Bourgeois - organ, synthesizers
 Vince Welnick - piano, electric piano, accordion
 Byron Allred - keyboards, piano
 Jimmy Pugh - organ
 Nate Ginsberg - piano
 Michael Pluznick - congas, shaker
 Mingo Lewis - shaker
 Michael Urbano - timbales
 Gary Yost - tambourine
 Michael Urbano - drums
 Prairie Prince - electronic drums, drums
 Barbara Imhnoff - harp
 Bobby Strickland - flute, saxophone
 Peter Apfelbaum - clarinet
 Jim Blinn - trombone
 Mike Rose - trumpet
 Bobby Womack - lead vocals on "The Want of a Nail"
 Various guests - backing vocals
 Various guests - strings
 Narada Michael Walden - choirmaster on "I Love My Life"

Charts 
Album - Billboard

Singles - Billboard

References 

Todd Rundgren albums
1989 albums
Albums produced by Todd Rundgren
Warner Records albums